Mioawateria malmii is a species of sea snail, a marine gastropod mollusk in the family Raphitomidae.

Description

Distribution
M. malmii can be found in the Gulf of Mexico, ranging from the coast of Louisiana to Cuba, also off Guadeloupe and in the Northern Atlantic Ocean (Azores, Bay of Biscay).

References

External links
  Morassi M. & Bonfitto A. (2013) Three new bathyal raphitomine gastropods (Mollusca: Conoidea) from the Indo-Pacific region. Zootaxa 3620(4): 579–588
 
 Biolib.cz : image
 
 Dautzenberg P. & Fischer H. (1896). Dragages effectués par l'Hirondelle et par la Princesse Alice 1888-1895. 1. Mollusques Gastéropodes. Mémoires de la Société Zoologique de France. 395-498, pl. 15-22
 Locard A. (1897-1898). Expéditions scientifiques du Travailleur et du Talisman pendant les années 1880, 1881, 1882 et 1883. Mollusques testacés. Paris, Masson. vol. 1 [1897], p. 1-516 pl. 1-22; vol. 2 [1898], p. 1-515, pl. 1-18
 MNHN, Paris: syntype

malmii
Gastropods described in 1889